Richard Hancock Moore (born Oxford, Granville County, North Carolina, August 30, 1960) was the North Carolina State Treasurer from 2001–2009. He was first elected to that post in 2000 and re-elected in 2004.

Career
Moore earned both his undergraduate and law degrees from Wake Forest University and a graduate diploma in accounting and finance from the London School of Economics.

A former assistant U.S. Attorney, Moore previously served in North Carolina government as a member of the North Carolina House of Representatives and as head of the North Carolina Department of Crime Control and Public Safety under former Governor Jim Hunt, before being elected state treasurer in 2000. In 1994, he ran for United States House of Representatives but lost in that year's Republican wave to David Funderburk. As Secretary of Crime Control & Public Safety, Moore managed the state response to and recovery from several natural disasters, particularly Hurricane Floyd. He is the co-author of a book, Faces from the Flood: Hurricane Floyd Remembered.

As Treasurer, Moore championed a national movement to protect shareholder rights against Wall Street corporate abuses. He authored investment and mutual fund protection principles which have been adopted by pension fund managers across the country. His efforts led to his appointment on the executive board of the New York Stock Exchange as the only public sector member, and he has served on the board of NYSE Regulation since its inception in 2005. He was also named the country's Top Public Official of the Year in 2004 by Governing Magazine, and profiled by U.S. News & World Report (June 7, 2004). In 2005, Moore was named as a finalist for Institutional Investor's Excellence in Investment Management Award.

As North Carolina's Treasurer and Chief Investment Officer, Moore managed more than $70 billion in pension funds.  The funds were rated either the first or second best funded pension plans in the country by Standard & Poor's throughout Moore's tenure. In his final year as Treasurer (2008), the funds outperformed their peer average by more than 900 basis points.   
  
Moore ran for Governor of North Carolina in 2008. He lost the Democratic primary to Lt. Gov. Beverly Perdue on May 6, 2008. In 2012, Moore said he would consider seeking the Democratic nomination for governor again, but he did not ultimately run.

After leaving office, Moore was named to the Board of Trustees of Wake Forest University, his alma mater.

In 2012, Moore became Chief Executive Officer of First Bancorp, a $10.6 billion community bank with more than 100 branches in North and South Carolina. Since taking over, First Bank's market cap has grown from $150 million to $1.33 billion. In 2019, he was named CEO of the Year by Business N.C Magazine.

Personal life
Moore and his wife, Noel, have three children: Will (the eldest), Charles, and Mary. Moore is a grandson of former U.S. Rep. Franklin Wills Hancock, Jr.

Eisenhower Fellowships selected Richard Moore as a USA Eisenhower Fellow in 2006.

References

External links
Moore Campaign site
Official Site – North Carolina Department of State Treasurer
Project Vote Smart – Richard H. Moore (NC) profile
North Carolina Democratic Party
Follow the Money – Richard H. Moore 2004 campaign contributions
Oral History Interview with Richard H. Moore from Oral Histories of the American South

|-

1960 births
Living people
People from Oxford, North Carolina
State treasurers of North Carolina
State cabinet secretaries of North Carolina
Alumni of the London School of Economics
Democratic Party members of the North Carolina House of Representatives
Wake Forest University alumni
American lawyers